Vedat Uysal (born 3 November 1962) is a former Turkish footballer and now manager, currently coaches Turkey national beach soccer team.

Playing career
Uysal began his career in 1979 at Galatasaray Youth Team, after two years he moved to Mersin İdman Yurdu and played for a season there. Then, he joined 2nd league team Vefa Simtel for two seasons. His performance earned him a transfer to Eskişehirspor in 1984. He played 4 seasons at Eskişehirspor, and also fulfilled his army duty during his spell and was selected for the Turkish national army football team.

In 1987, Eskişehirspor reached the Turkish Cup final, but lost to Gençlerbirliği. On later season, they clutched the Turkish Prime Ministership Cup (a defunct cup) by beating Beşiktaş. Subsequently, he joined Sakaryaspor in 1989–90 season. He played five times for this team and finalized the season before joining to Fenerbahçe on loan, where the team captured the second place and won the Prisendency Cup (a defunct cup). In 1990–91 season, he joined Karşıyaka and spent 1.5 year before his transfer to Sakaryaspor again. He played 4.5 years for this team and then retired.

Club Team

Premier League:
Second (1): 1989–90 (with Fenerbahçe.)

Turkey Cup:
Second (2): 1982–83 (with Mersin İdman Yurdu.), 1986–87 (with Eskisehirspor.)

Presidential Cup: 1
1990 (with Fenerbahçe.)

Prime Minister's Cup: 1
1987 (with Eskisehirspor.)

Managerial career
Uysal is now the coach of Turkey national beach soccer team, besides the Sakarya regional technical authority of TFF.

ESBL Preliminary Event, Athens, Greece: 2007

In late June 2008, Turkey beach soccer team participated in a private cup, Challenge Cup, held in Netanya, Israel.
They achieved 3rd place after the play-off match against Norway.
Challenge Cup, Netanya, Israel: 2008 -3rd place

BSWW Euro League Stage 2, Tignes (French Alps), France: 2008

Challenge Cup, The Hague, Netherlands : 2010 Champions

Portugal Lisbon promoted to Division A in Turkey: 2010 Champions

Coaching qualifications and participation in seminars

 1998 – A Course, Manisa
 2000 – Trainer Development Seminar, Sakarya
 2002 – Trainer Development Seminar, Sakarya
 2004 – Trainer Development Seminar, Sakarya
 2005 – Technical Director, Training, Istanbul
 2007 – Technical Director, Seminar, Antalya
 2007 – 20th Technical Director for International Development Seminar, Antalya
 2007 – FIFA Beach Soccer Region Europe Seminar, Cesme- İzmir
 2009 – 21 International Coach Development Congress, Antalya
 2011 – 22 International Coach Development Congress, Antalya

References

Footballers from Istanbul
Turkish football managers
1962 births
Galatasaray S.K. footballers
Sakaryaspor footballers
Fenerbahçe S.K. footballers
Living people
Association football utility players